Wendell F. Holland, Jr. (born March 8, 1984) is an American furniture company owner best known for competing on the American reality show Survivor. On May 23, 2018, he was revealed as the winner of the show's 36th season, Survivor: Ghost Island. He returned for the show's 40th season Survivor: Winners at War, where he was eliminated in 13th place. Since 2020, he has been a co-host on HGTV’s Hot Mess House.

Early life
Holland grew up in Ardmore, Pennsylvania and graduated from Harriton High School. He attended Morehouse College, where he graduated Phi Beta Kappa, and University of Pennsylvania Law School, where he became a lawyer. After selling several home-made beds on Craigslist, he ultimately left his law practice and founded Beve Unlimited, a furniture company in Philadelphia.

Survivor

Ghost Island
In 2018, Holland participated in Survivor: Ghost Island, the 36th season of Survivor. He started on the Naviti tribe where he immediately formed a close alliance with Domenick Abbate. Following the first tribe switch with the rival Malolo tribe, he and Abbate remained on Naviti along with former tribemates Chris Noble, Morgan Ricke and Angela Perkins. The former Naviti members held the majority on the tribe but Noble was seen as a potential target due to earlier friction with Abbate. Following Naviti's next immunity challenge loss, however, Noble was sent to Ghost Island by the rival tribe, sparing him from that night's vote. Holland and Abbate attempted to target Perkins in order to weaken Noble's position, but this allowed for the former Malolo members on the new Naviti tribe to seize an opportunity. Ricke was blindsided at Tribal Council instead of Perkins, shocking Holland and Abbate.

Despite appearing to be on the bottom, Holland stayed in the game after Naviti won the next two challenges. Following the second tribe switch, he was sent to the newly formed Yanuya tribe, where he found Erik Reichenbach's immunity necklace from Micronesia, which was now a hidden immunity idol. Yanuya won the remaining challenges, allowing Holland to make it to the merge.

At the merge, Holland reconnected with Abbate and shortly thereafter, the two men formed a secret Final Four alliance with original Malolo members Donathan Hurley and Laurel Johnson. At the Final Eight, Holland was targeted by the female members from the original Naviti tribe, but managed to escape elimination. Holland's social acumen strengthened as the game went forward, despite Abbate being seen as the more overt dominant player of the duo. Holland carefully cultivated his bonds on the island, particularly with Johnson.

However, as the endgame neared, Hurley recognized that the opportunity to oust Abbate and Holland from power was quickly evaporating. He attempted to enlist Johnson in potentially removing one of them from the game, but Johnson's loyalty to the duo was unwavering. At the Final Five, Holland reciprocated Johnson's loyalty by using Reichenbach's necklace idol on her, while Hurley was unanimously voted out for his betrayal. Abbate, however, soon recognized that his staunch ally throughout the game was also his biggest threat to win. When Abbate won the final immunity challenge, he saved Johnson from elimination and instead forced Holland and Perkins to compete in a fire-making challenge. Holland defeated Perkins, earning himself the remaining spot at the Final Tribal Council.

During the Final Tribal Council, Holland was praised for his effortless social game, whereas Abbate was hailed as the more overt strategic force in the partnership. This created difficulty for the jury in extricating one's game from the other, and Holland and Abbate received five jury votes each, resulting in the first tied jury vote in Survivor history. The responsibility of breaking the tie fell to the remaining finalist, Johnson, who had received no votes for her passive gameplay. Johnson became the final jury member and cast the winning vote, leaving Holland and Abbate at her mercy. On May 23, 2018, Jeff Probst revealed that Johnson voted for Holland, thus making him the Sole Survivor.

Winners at War
Holland returned as a contestant on the show's 40th season, Survivor: Winners at War. Starting on the Dakal tribe, Holland quickly found himself in a strong alliance involving himself, Yul Kwon, Sophie Clarke and Nick Wilson. However, Holland's comfortable position changed after the Tribe Swap sent him, along with Kwon and Wilson, to the Sele tribe, where he was reunited with his ex-girlfriend Michele Fitzgerald. Despite attempts to mend fences and keep a civil alliance, Fitzgerald's presence soon brought out a distant abrasiveness in Holland's demeanor, which their tribemates soon picked up on, and which former Sele member Parvati Shallow hoped to exploit by targeting him. However, Shallow's attempt to flip the majority on its head failed when Fitzgerald refused to go along with blindsiding Holland, and Shallow was voted out of the game.

Holland was unable to shake the target that his earlier perception had put on his back, and when Sele lost another challenge (partially due to Holland's hubris), he was again targeted. However, he managed to settle differences with Fitzgerald and his stronger bond with Wilson allowed for him to survive the vote, with Kwon being eliminated instead just before the tribes merged.

When Holland reached the merge, he angled to forge an alliance with Jeremy Collins. Clarke, who felt betrayed by her former alliance members with Kwon's blindside, found this concerning and decided to rally the votes against Holland. Holland would be blindsided at the first tribal council of the merge, being sent to the Edge of Extinction with the other ousted players. Holland would still have an opportunity to return to the game on Day 35, but he was narrowly beaten out by Natalie Anderson, who won the return challenge from the Edge and rejoined the game. The remaining contestants on the Edge were permanently eliminated and sent to the jury, where Holland cast his vote for eventual Sole Survivor Tony Vlachos.

Awards and nominations
Holland competed in the HGTV reality show Beach Cabana Royale, where he was eliminated in last place.

Personal
Holland is the son of Wendell Foster Holland Sr. (born February 10, 1952), an attorney educated at Fordham University and the Rutgers Law School. He is of Guyanese descent from his maternal grandfather, Darson.

References

External links

Official CBS biography page

1984 births
Living people
Morehouse College alumni
People from Philadelphia
University of Pennsylvania Law School alumni
Survivor (American TV series) winners
Winners in the Survivor franchise